Simaethistis tricolor is a moth in the family Simaethistidae. It was described by Arthur Gardiner Butler in 1889. It is known from India.

References

Ditrysia
Moths described in 1889